The 28 cm schwere Bruno Kanone (E - Eisenbahnlafette (railroad mounting)), often abbreviated as s.Br.K, was a German railroad gun used during World War II in the invasion of France and on coast-defense duties in Occupied Norway for the rest of the war. Two were built using pre-World War I coast-defense guns during the 1930s.

Design
As part of the re-armament program initiated by the Nazis after taking power in 1933 the Army High Command (Oberkommando des Heeres - OKH) ordered Krupp to begin work on new railroad artillery designs, but they would take a long time to develop. Krupp pointed out that it could deliver a number of railroad guns much more quickly using obsolete guns already on hand and modernizing their original World War I mountings for which it still had drawings available.

Two aged 28 cm Küsten Kanone L/42 (42 caliber Coastal Cannon) guns seized from the Belgians on the outbreak of World War I had survived the war and were placed on new mounts that were shared by all of the 28 cm "Bruno" railroad guns. The gun could traverse only enough on the mount itself for fine corrections, coarser adjustments had to be made by turning the entire mount on the Vögele turntable. The turntable (Drehscheibe) consisted of a circular track with a pivot mount in the center for a platform on which the railroad gun itself was secured. A ramp was used to raise the railway gun to the level of the platform. The platform had rollers at each end which rested on the circular rail for 360° traverse. The gun could only be loaded at 0° elevation and so had to be re-aimed for each shot. Both guns were delivered by 1938.

Combat history
During the Battle of France schwere Brunos equipped Railroad Artillery Battery (Artillerie-Batterie (E.) 689 for which the only known activity was firing on targets in southern Alsace from Lörrach between 14 and 17 June 1940. The battery was later transferred to Nærbø, Norway for coast defense duties under the command of Artillery Group Stavanger-South (Artilleriegruppe Stavanger-Süd).  Lastly they were moved East along the coast to guard the port of Fredrikstad, Norway, when four  ex-French railroad guns were transferred in from Narvik in 1944.

Notes

References
 Engelmann, Joachim. German Railroad Guns in Action. Carrollton, Texas: Squadron/Signal, 1976 
 Engelmann, Joachim and Scheibert, Horst. Deutsche Artillerie 1934-1945: Eine Dokumentation in Text, Skizzen und Bildern: Ausrüstung, Gliederung, Ausbildung, Führung, Einsatz. Limburg/Lahn, Germany: C. A. Starke, 1974
 François, Guy. Eisenbahnartillerie: Histoire de l'artillerie lourd sur voie ferrée allemande des origines à 1945. Paris: Editions Histoire et Fortifications, 2006
 Gander, Terry and Chamberlain, Peter. Weapons of the Third Reich: An Encyclopedic Survey of All Small Arms, Artillery and Special Weapons of the German Land Forces 1939-1945. New York: Doubleday, 1979 
 Hogg, Ian V. German Artillery of World War Two. 2nd corrected edition. Mechanicsville, PA: Stackpole Books, 1997 
 Kosar, Franz. Eisenbahngeschütz der Welt. Stuttgart: Motorbook, 1999

External links
 Festung Norwegen

World War II artillery of Germany
Railway guns
280 mm artillery
Military equipment introduced in the 1930s